Ahmet Erdoğan may refer to:

 Ahmet Erdoğan (basketball) (born 1986), Turkish basketball player
 Ahmet Burak Erdoğan (born 1979), eldest son of Recep Tayyip Erdoğan, the current Prime Minister of Turkey